Fructosides are glycosides where the glycone group is fructose.

Fructosyl transferases 
In enzymology, enzymes that add a fructose group to a molecule are called fructosyl-transferases, beta-D-fructofuranosyl transferases or fructotranferases. Examples are:

 aldose beta-D-fructosyltransferase
 2,1-fructan:2,1-fructan 1-fructosyltransferase
 6G-fructosyltransferase
 Inulin fructotransferase (DFA-I-forming)
 Inulin fructotransferase (DFA-III-forming)
 Levan fructotransferase (DFA-IV-forming)
 Levansucrase

References 

Glycosides by glycone type